Claudine Arnaud (born Claudine Verhelle; 9 January 1940 – 5 December 2017) was a Belgian coloratura soprano.

Life 
Arnaud studied music in Brussels with Mina Bolotine, making her debut as the Queen of the Night at the Royal Flemish Opera. She performed at La Monnaie in 1960, remaining on the roster there for ten years, during which she also performed in Ghent, Verviers, Liège, Bordeaux, and Bonn. She sang Olympia in Les contes d'Hoffmann for the Paris Opera in 1963.

In 1960, she debuted at the Glyndebourne Festival as the Queen of the Night, a role which she sang there the following year as well. In 1964 her performance of the role from the festival was televised.

Other roles in her repertory included Gilda in Rigoletto; Donna Anna and Zerlina in Don Giovanni; Leila in Les pêcheurs de perles; Zdenka in Arabella; Sophie in Der Rosenkavalier; Musetta in La bohème; Rosina in The Barber of Seville; Zerbinetta in Ariadne auf Naxos; Woglinde in Der Ring des Nibelungen; the princess in Mârouf, savetier du Caire; and the title roles in Manon and Lucia di Lammermoor.

Her work in contemporary opera included the role of Bolivia in the opera  (group-composed by Louis Andriessen, Reinbert de Leeuw, Peter Schat and ). She also taught at the Royal Conservatory in Mons.

Death
Formerly married to the music critic Willy Clijmans, she died on 5 December 2017 in Brussels, aged 77, from undisclosed causes.

References

1940 births
2017 deaths
Belgian operatic sopranos
20th-century Belgian women opera singers
21st-century Belgian women opera singers